Reynell is a single-member electoral district for the South Australian House of Assembly. It is named after John Reynell, a founder of the Agricultural and Horticultural Society of South Australia and noted 19th-century wheat farmer, sheep and cattle breeder, vigneron and winemaker in the area. Reynell is a 33.1 km² urban residential and industrial electorate in Adelaide's far south. It includes the suburbs of Christies Beach, Christie Downs, Hackham West, Lonsdale, Noarlunga Centre, O'Sullivan Beach, Port Noarlunga and Reynella, as well as part of Morphett Vale.

Reynell was created for the 1993 state election as a fairly safe Labor seat, but was won by Julie Greig for the Liberals as part of a statewide landslide. It was reclaimed for Labor at the 1997 election by Gay Thompson. Labor's Katrine Hildyard succeeded her at the 2014 election.

Members for Reynell

Election results

Notes

References
 ECSA profile for Reynell: 2018
 ABC profile for Reynell: 2018
 Poll Bludger profile for Reynell: 2018

1993 establishments in Australia
Electoral districts of South Australia